Zacualpan (Nahuatl: "place above the pyramid") is a municipality in the Mexican state of Veracruz, located  northwest of the state capital of Xalapa and  northeast of the city of Pachuca, Hidalgo.

Geography
It borders the Veracruzian municipalities of Huayacocotla to the west, Texcatepec to the north, and Tlachichilco to the northeast, as well as the Hidalgan municipalities of San Bartolo Tutotepec to the southwest and Agua Blanca de Iturbide to the south.

Zacualpan is located in the Huasteca Karst of the Sierra Madre Oriental. Its land cover is divided between forest (50%), pastureland (25%) and farmland (25%). It is watered by tributaries of the Vinazco River, itself a tributary of the Tuxpan River.

Zacualpan's climate is humid with rain throughout the year.

History
The area was originally inhabited by the Huastec people. Zacualpan was separated from Huayacocotla to form its own municipality on 13 November 1875. It became a free municipality on 15 January 1918.

Administration
The municipal government comprises a president, a councillor (Spanish: síndico), and a trustee (regidor). The current president of the municipality is Carina Lugo Barrón.

Demographics
In the 2010 Mexican Census, the municipality of Zacualpan recorded a population of 6784 inhabitants living in 1821 households. The 2015 Intercensal Survey estimated a population of 7194 inhabitants in Zacualpan.

There are 69 localities in the municipality, of which only the municipal seat, also known as Zacualpan, is classified as urban. It recorded a population of 633 inhabitants in the 2010 Census.

Economy
Major economic activities in Zacualpan include forestry and farming. Zacualpan produced  of timber in 2015, second to Huayacocotla among municipalities in Veracruz. Cattle and pigs are the main livestock raised, while corn, peaches and apples are the main agricultural crops.

References

Municipalities of Veracruz
1875 establishments in Mexico
States and territories established in 1875